Dexter Cyrus (born 27 December 1969) is a retired Trinidadian footballer.

Career statistics

International

International goals
Scores and results list Trinidad and Tobago's goal tally first.

References

1969 births
Living people
Trinidad and Tobago footballers
Trinidad and Tobago international footballers
Association football forwards
Police F.C. (Trinidad and Tobago) players
United Petrotrin F.C. players